TR 3 or TR3 or TR-3 may refer to:

Aeronautics
 TR-3 Black Manta, a speculated spyplane and black program by the USAF
 Lyulka TR-3, a 1940s Soviet jet engine
 TR.3, Orenda Engines

Other uses
 Tomb Raider III, the third game in the Tomb Raider series
 TR3 (band), the Tim Reynolds Trio
 Triumph TR3, a car from the United Kingdom
 TR3, a postal district in the TR postcode area
 .tr3, a file extension format for the TomeRaider ebook reader
 Black triangle (UFO) TR3 subtype
 Tier 3 (nightclub)

See also
 TR3A (disambiguation)